Aphrodite Terra  is one of the three continental regions on the planet Venus, the others being Ishtar Terra and Lada Terra. It is named for Aphrodite, the Greek equivalent of the goddess Venus, and is found near the equator of the planet. Aphrodite Terra is about half the size of Africa, making it the largest of the terrae.

Description

Aphrodite Terra was named by the International Astronomical Union, the governing body for planetary and satellite nomenclature, after Aphrodite, the goddess of love. The name was chosen because Aphrodite is the Greek equivalent of the Roman goddess Venus.

Located near the equator of Venus, Aphrodite Terra has an area about half the size of Africa, and is much larger than the rougher Ishtar Terra. It is covered with deep rift valleys. Like Ishtar Terra,  Aphrodite Terra also has mountain ranges but they are only about half the size of the mountains on Ishtar.

Extending nearly two thirds around the planet, Aphrodite Terra's topography appears buckled and fractured which suggests large compressive forces. There are also numerous extensive lava flows across this terrain and some have an interesting bow shape to them due to atmospheric gravity waves.

Aphrodite Terra has two main regions: Ovda Regio in the west and Thetis Regio in the east. Ovda Regio has ridges running in two directions, suggesting that the compressive forces are acting in several directions. Certain dark regions appear to be solidified lava flows. A series of cracks appear where lava has welled up through the surface and flooded the surrounding terrain.

Gallery

See also
Vega 1
Vega 2

References

Bibliography
1. D. A. Senske, "Geology of the Venus equatorial region from Pioneer Venus radar imaging," Part 3 Regional Geology, Earth, Moon, and Planets, July 1990, Volume 50, Issue 1, Springer, pp 305–327.

2. L. S. Crumpler, "Eastern Aphrodite Terra on Venus: Characteristics, structure, and mode of origin," Part 3 Regional Geology, Earth, Moon, and Planets, July 1990, Volume 50, Issue 1, Springer, pp 343–388. (Page 1).

External links
NASA Map of Venus:

Surface features of Venus